Ceyhun Yılmaz (born 5 October 1976) is a Turkish comedian, actor, radio and TV presenter.

Life and career

In 2002, Ceyhun Yılmaz published his first poetry book; in the same year, he left school and his TV and radio positions to join the army. After spending 4 months in Van, Turkey, he toured all of the provinces, doing 107 stand-up shows for the troops and high ranking officials.

He completed his military service in 2003 and returned to radio work and immediately published his second poetry book, Kasımın Bıçak Yarası. He began presenting shows in the same year. He signed a contract with TRT for a television program in 2004 and presented Şov Rüzgarı for 14 episodes. In 2005, he transferred to Cine5 and introduced the program Ceyhun Yılmaz Talk Show, which aired every night of the week. Throughout its 165 episodes, the program featured 210 famous guests. 

In 2006, he published another poetry book entitled İkinci El Yalnızlık and donated the profits from the book sales to the Turkish Kidney Foundation and Turkish Education Volunteers Foundation.

Between February 2004 and May 2006, he had a recurring role in the TV series Hayat Bilgisi, spanning 92 episodes. On 13 May 2006, as a result of an accident while filming the series, he broke his foot and arm. On the same day, his mother died, prompting him to leave the workforce. 

In June 2007, he made another agreement with TRT and presented the program Sayısal Gece throughout the summer. In the same year, he appeared in the series Küçük Hanımefendi, which also starred Tuba Ünsal. In 2008, he co-hosted Sayısal Gece on TRT with Sibel Can and continued the program in the winter season, presenting a total of 40 episodes. In 2009, he presented the program İstanbul Sokakları on TRT Müzik. In 2011, he prepared and presented the sports program Hoş Beş Iki for 13 episodes, together with Simge Fıstıkoğlu on Habertürk TV.

In 2011, he prepared and presented the 21 sports-talk show program on Lig TV. In 2011, he published the books Sensiz Harfler, a combination of his previous 3 books, and Sevdiğim İkinci Kadınsın Sen. The profits from the sales were donated to Children with Leukemia Health and Education Foundation. 

He attended more than 100 university panels as a speaker between 1999-2012 and has received multiple awards throughout his career. He has made cameos in various films, including Hababam Sınıfı Merhaba, Hababam Sınıfı Askerde, Maskeli Beşler, Maskeli Beşler: Irak, Maskeli Beşler: Kıbrıs, Osmanlı Cumhuriyeti, and Çakallarla Dans, as well as the TV series Melekler Korusun, Leyla ile Mecnun and Babam İçin.

In 2013, he presented the daily Ceyhun Yılmaz Show on Alem FM. In addition, he did an alternative broadcast online called PACYA, airing between commercials and at different times of the day.

Since February, 2020, he has been presenting a program on Kafa Radyo.

Bibliography

Poetry books

Filmography

As presenter

As actor

References

External links 
 ceyhunyilmaz.com

1976 births
Turkish male film actors
Turkish male television actors
Turkish stand-up comedians
Living people